The Coupe de France's results of the 1969–70 season. AS Saint-Étienne won the final played on May 31, 1970, beating FC Nantes.

Round of 16

Quarter-finals

Semi-finals
First round

Second round

Final

References

French federation

1969–70 domestic association football cups
1969–70 in French football
1969-70